The Russian Maoist Party (RMP; , РМП) is a Marxist-Leninist-Maoist party in Russia. It was established on June 9, 2000.

Ideology

The RMP accepts the legacy of the Russian Social Democratic Labour Party [RSDLP], the Russian Social-Democratic Labor Party (Bolshevik) [RSDLP(b)], the Russian Communist Party (Bolshevik) [RCP(b)], the Communist Party of the Soviet Union (Bolshevik) [CPSU(b)], and the Communist Party of the Soviet Union [CPSU], until 1953. They also accept the legacy of the Chinese Communist Party [CCP] until 1976 making it anti-revisionist.

The RMP rejects the legacy of the CPSU since 1953 and of the CCP since 1976. They consider the succeeding regimes of Nikita Khrushchev and Leonid Brezhnev as social-imperialism to be one of the ugliest totalitarian social systems in world history and see its continuation in the post-Soviet Russia of Boris Yeltsin and Vladimir Putin.

The party formerly had fraternal relations with the Maoist Internationalist Movement and currently with the International Conference of Marxist-Leninist Parties and Organizations, also RMP is known as member of the International Coordination of Revolutionary Parties and Organizations.

References

External links
Official website

2000 establishments in Russia
Communist parties in Russia
Far-left politics in Russia
International Conference of Marxist–Leninist Parties and Organizations (International Newsletter)
International Coordination of Revolutionary Parties and Organizations
Maoist organizations in Europe
Opposition to Vladimir Putin
Political parties established in 2000